Lewisport is a home rule-class city in the floodplain of the Ohio River in Hancock County, Kentucky, in the United States. The population was 1,670 at the 2010 census, and is also the most populous community in the county. It is included in the Owensboro metropolitan area.

History
Lewisport was originally a ferry landing site known as "Little Yellow Banks", in allusion to Owensboro's original name of "Yellow Banks". The first settler was James Prentis, who platted the current town in 1837 with his brother John. An attempt to rename the city "Prentisport" failed, though, when James insisted the town be named after his friend Dr. John Lewis instead. The town was chartered as "Lewisport" in 1839, and the post office was established under that name in 1844. The city was formally incorporated by the state assembly the same year, but needed to be reincorporated in 1882.

Logging and flatboat construction were the initial chief industries. The river has flooded the city repeatedly, and the importance of lumber construction and industry has sparked several major fires.

Abraham Lincoln won his first case – Commonwealth of Kentucky v. Abraham Lincoln – in Lewisport's Pate House, at the time the site of the local circuit court. He was tried in the east room of the log house before Squire Pate for operating a ferry across the Ohio River without a license, but the justice of the peace dismissed the case against him. The house is now a county landmark and is open for tours throughout the year.

During the Civil War, Bill Davison and Isaac Coulter captured and robbed the steamship Morning Star here on December 23, 1864, killing three Union soldiers. The town's only bank was shuttered during the Great Depression. Upon its founding in 1938, the Lewisport School System comprised eight local one-room schools; today it is part of the Hancock County Consolidated School System.

Geography
Lewisport is located in northwestern Hancock County at  (37.935023, -86.905270), on the south bank of the Ohio River. U.S. Route 60 passes east-west through the southern end of Lewisport.

Demographics

As of the census of 2000, there were 1,639 people, 648 households, and 452 families residing in the city. The racial makeup of the city was 96.40% White, 1.89% African American, 0.37% Native American, 0.61% Asian, 0.24% from other races, and 0.49% from two or more races. Hispanic or Latino of any race were 1.65% of the population.

There were 648 households, out of which 35.2% had children under the age of 18 living with them, 53.4% were married couples living together, 12.5% had a female householder with no husband present, and 30.2% were non-families. 27.6% of all households were made up of individuals, and 11.4% had someone living alone who was 65 years of age or older. The average household size was 2.43 and the average family size was 2.98.

In the city, the population was spread out, with 25.8% under the age of 18, 10.2% from 18 to 24, 27.4% from 25 to 44, 21.2% from 45 to 64, and 15.4% who were 65 years of age or older. The median age was 35 years. For every 100 females, there were 88.2 males. For every 100 females age 18 and over, there were 84.5 males.

The median income for a household in the city was $35,774, and the median income for a family was $42,321. Males had a median income of $39,318 versus $21,705 for females. The per capita income for the city was $16,413. About 15.6% of families and 17.0% of the population were below the poverty line, including 24.7% of those under age 18 and 16.6% of those age 65 or over.

Education
Lewisport has a lending library, a branch of the Hancock County Public Library. It was home to Lewisport Elementary School, later replaced by North Hancock Elementary School in 2006.

See also
 List of cities and towns along the Ohio River

References

External links
City of Lewisport official website

Populated places established in 1839
Cities in Kentucky
Cities in Hancock County, Kentucky
Owensboro metropolitan area
Kentucky populated places on the Ohio River